The final of the Women's 400 metres event at the 2003 Pan American Games took place on Friday August 8, 2003, with the heats staged a day earlier. Hazel-Ann Regis won the only silver medal for Grenada at the 2003 Pan American Games.

Medalists

Records

Results

See also
2003 World Championships in Athletics – Women's 400 metres
Athletics at the 2004 Summer Olympics – Women's 400 metres

Notes

References
Results

400 metres, Women's
2003
2003 in women's athletics